The Symphony for Organ No. 6 (Symphonie VI pour orgue) in G minor, Op. 42, No. 2, is an organ symphony by Charles-Marie Widor. Completed in 1878, the composer premiered it at the Palais du Trocadéro as part of the Paris World Exhibition. It was first published by Hamelle in 1879, together with the famous Symphony for Organ No. 5.

History 
Widor composed the work, one of ten organ symphonies, when he was organist at Saint-Sulpice, a post he held from 1870. The church features a main organ by Aristide Cavaillé-Coll which inspired the composer who wrote "If I had not experienced the seduction of these timbres or the mystical attraction of this wave of sound, I would never have written organ music." Widor's first four symphonies were published by J. Maho in 1872 as his Op. 13. The two following symphonies were published as his Op. 42 in 1879 by Julien Hamelle, Maho's successor. They were reprinted in 1887, now with the revised first four, and the new No. VII and VIII, with a foreword by the composer regarding "the style, the procedures of registration and the signs". Widor often revised his works several times even after publication.

Widor probably composed the Symphonie VI between his return from a visit to Bayreuth in 1876, where he attended the first Bayreuth Festival, presenting the first performance of Wagner's Der Ring des Nibelungen, and the summer of 1878. He premiered it for the inauguration of a Cavaillé-Coll organ at the Palais du Trocadéro in Paris on 24 August 1878 as part of the Paris World Exhibition.

A critical edition of Symponie VI was published by Carus-Verlag in 2015, based predominantly on the last edition during Widor's lifetime, 1929.

Structure and music 
The work is structured in five movements:
 Allegro
 Adagio
 Intermezzo
 Cantabile
 Finale

Widor's organ symphonies are not as much a structural unit, but extended suites with orchestral sound. He wrote: "The modern organ is thus symphonic in essence. The new instrument demands a new language, an ideal differing from scholastic polyphony."

The first movement introduces a chorale-like theme, and expands in both sonata form and variations. A recitative-episode becomes a second theme. The second movement, in three sections, present "sensual  chromaticism", with a registration of "Gambes et Voix célestes". According to Albert Schweitzer, it was inspired by Wagner's music heard in Bayreuth. The third movement serves as a scherzo. Three voices receive a specific sound by the registration "Anches et cornets de 4 et de 8", like the grand jeu of the classical French organ school. The fourth movement has a lengthy theme, of which several motifs are derived. The fifth movement is a sonata-rondo, culminating in a "tumultuous coda".

Recordings 
 Charles-Marie Widor (1844–1937) / Organ Symphony No.5, Op.42, No.1 / Organ Symphony No.6, Op.42, No.2, Colin Walsh, organ of Lincoln Cathedral built by Father Henry Willis in 1898 (2005)
 Charles-Marie Widor (1844–1937) / Organ Symphony No.6, Op.42, No.2 / Organ Symphony No.5, Op.42, No.1, Joseph Nolan, organ of L’église de la Madeleine, Paris, by Cavaillé-Coll (2011)

References

External links
 
 Widor Organ Symphonies Gramophone 1989

Compositions by Charles-Marie Widor
1879 compositions
Compositions for organ
Widor
Compositions in G minor
World's fair music
Exposition Universelle (1878)